Ukshi railway station is a station on the Konkan Railway in India. Ranpat Falls is nearby. Ukshi railway station is located 183.962 kilometre south of Roha railway station which is starting point for Konkan railway jurisdiction.

Karbude tunnel 
A 6.5 km-long tunnel known as the Karbude Tunnel is part of the railway. It is situated between Ukshi and Bhoke Stations. It is the line's longest tunnel. The Karbude Tunnel remained India's longest rail tunnel until the Pir Panjal Railway Tunnel surpassed it.

References 

Railway stations along Konkan Railway line
Railway stations in Ratnagiri district
Ratnagiri railway division